Synanthedon is a genus of moths in the family Sesiidae.

Species

Synanthedon acerni (Clemens, 1860)
Synanthedon acerrubri Engelhardt, 1925
Synanthedon aequalis (Walker, [1865])
Synanthedon aericincta (Meyrick, 1928)
Synanthedon africana (Le Cerf, 1917)
Synanthedon albicornis (Edwards, 1881)
Synanthedon alenica (Strand, [1913])
Synanthedon alleri (Engelhardt, 1946)
Synanthedon andrenaeformis (Laspeyres, 1801)
Synanthedon andrenaeformis andrenaeformis (Laspeyres, 1801)
Synanthedon andrenaeformis tenuicingulata  Špatenka, 1997
Synanthedon anisozona (Meyrick, 1918)
Synanthedon apicalis (Walker, [1865])
Synanthedon arctica (Beutenmüller, 1900)
Synanthedon arizonensis (Beutenmüller, 1916)
Synanthedon arkansasensis Duckworth & Eichlin, 1973
Synanthedon astyarcha (Meyrick, 1930)
Synanthedon aulograpta (Meyrick, 1934)
Synanthedon aurania (Druce, 1899)
Synanthedon auripes (Hampson, 1910a)
Synanthedon auriplena (Walker, [1865])
Synanthedon auritincta (Wileman & South, 1918)
Synanthedon bellatula Wang & Yang, 2002
Synanthedon beutenmuelleri Heppner & Duckworth, 1981
Synanthedon bibionipennis (Boisduval, 1869)
Synanthedon bicingulata (Staudinger, 1887)
Synanthedon bifenestrata Gaede, 1929
Synanthedon bolteri (Edwards, 1883)
Synanthedon bosqi Köhler, 1941
Synanthedon caeruleifascia (Rothschild, 1911)
Synanthedon calamis (Druce, 1899)
Synanthedon canadensis Duckworth & Eichlin, 1973
Synanthedon cardinalis (Dampf, 1930)
Synanthedon castaneae (Busck, 1913)
Synanthedon castanevora Yang & Wang, 1989
Synanthedon catalina Meyrick, 1926
Synanthedon caternaulti Strand, 1925
Synanthedon caucasica Gorbunov, 1986
Synanthedon cephiformis (Ochsenheimer, 1808)
Synanthedon cerceriformis (Walker, 1856)
Synanthedon ceres (Druce, 1883)
Synanthedon cerskisi Gorbunov, 1994
Synanthedon cerulipes (Hampson, 1900)
Synanthedon chalybea (Walker, 1862)
Synanthedon chlorothyris (Meyrick, 1935)
Synanthedon chrysidipennis (Boisduval, 1869)
Synanthedon chrysonympha (Meyrick, 1932)
Synanthedon cinnamomumvora Wang & Yang, 2002
Synanthedon cirrhozona Diakonoff, [1968]
Synanthedon citrura (Meyrick, 1927)
Synanthedon clavicornis (Walker, [1865])
Synanthedon codeti (Oberthür, 1881)
Synanthedon colchidensis Špatenka & Gorbunov, 1992
Synanthedon concavifascia Le Cerf, 1916
Synanthedon conopiformis (Esper, 1782)
Synanthedon cruciati Bettag & Bläsius, 2002
Synanthedon cubana (Herrich-Schäffer, 1866)
Synanthedon culiciformis (Linnaeus, 1758)
Synanthedon cupreifascia (Miskin, 1892)
Synanthedon cyanescens (Hampson, 1910)
Synanthedon cyanospira (Meyrick, 1928)
Synanthedon dasyproctos (Zukowsky, 1936b)
Synanthedon dasysceles Bradley, 1968
Synanthedon decipiens (Edwards, 1881)
Synanthedon dominicki Duckworth & Eichlin, 1973
Synanthedon drucei Heppner & Duckworth, 1981
Synanthedon dybowskii (Le Cerf, 1917)
Synanthedon erythrogama (Meyrick, 1934)
Synanthedon erythromma Hampson, 1919
Synanthedon esperi Špatenka & Arita, 1992
Synanthedon ethiopica (Hampson, 1919)
Synanthedon exitiosa (Say, 1823)
Synanthedon exochiformis (Walker, 1856)
Synanthedon fatifera Hodges, 1963
Synanthedon ferox (Meyrick, 1929)
Synanthedon flavicaudata (Moore, 1887)
Synanthedon flavicincta (Hampson, [1893])
Synanthedon flavipalpis (Hampson, 1910)
Synanthedon flavipalpus (Hampson, [1893])
Synanthedon flavipectus (Hampson, 1910)
Synanthedon flaviventris (Staudinger, 1883)
Synanthedon flavostigma Zukowsky, 1936
Synanthedon formicaeformis (Esper, 1783)
Synanthedon fukuzumii Špatenka & Arita, 1992
Synanthedon fulvipes (Harris, 1839)
Synanthedon gabuna (Beutenmüller, 1899)
Synanthedon geliformis (Walker, 1856)
Synanthedon geranii Kallies, 1997
Synanthedon glyptaeformis (Walker, 1856)
Synanthedon gracilis (Hampson, 1910)
Synanthedon guineabia (Strand, [1913])
Synanthedon hadassa (Meyrick, 1932)
Synanthedon haemorrhoidalis (Fabricius, 1775)
Synanthedon haitangvora Yang, 1977
Synanthedon halmyris (Druce, 1889)
Synanthedon hector (Butler, 1878)
Synanthedon heilongjiangana Zhang, 1987 (nomen nudum)
Synanthedon hela (Druce, 1889)
Synanthedon helenis (Engelhardt, 1946)
Synanthedon hemigymna Zukowsky, 1936
Synanthedon hermione (Druce, 1889)
Synanthedon hippolyte (Druce, 1889)
Synanthedon hippophae Xu, 1997
Synanthedon hongye Yang, 1977
Synanthedon howqua (Moore, 1877)
Synanthedon hunanensis Xu & Liu, 1992
Synanthedon ignifera (Hampson, [1893])
Synanthedon iris Le Cerf, 1916
Synanthedon javana Le Cerf, 1916
Synanthedon kathyae Duckworth & Eichlin, 1977
Synanthedon kunmingensis Yang & Wang, 1989
Synanthedon laticincta (Burmeister, 1878)
Synanthedon laticivora (Meyrick, 1927)
Synanthedon lecerfi Heppner & Duckworth, 1981
Synanthedon lemoulti Le Cerf, 1917
Synanthedon leptomorpha (Meyrick, 1931)
Synanthedon leptosceles Bradley, 1968
Synanthedon leucogaster (Hampson, 1919)
Synanthedon loranthi (Králícek, 1966)
Synanthedon maculiventris Le Cerf, 1916
Synanthedon mardia (Druce, 1892)
Synanthedon martenii Zukowsky, 1936
Synanthedon martjanovi Sheljuzhko, 1918
Synanthedon melliniformis (Laspeyres, 1801)
Synanthedon mellinipennis (Boisduval, 1836)
Synanthedon menglaensis Yang & Wang, 1989
Synanthedon mercatrix (Meyrick, 1931)
Synanthedon mesiaeformis (Herrich-Schäffer, 1846)
Synanthedon mesochoriformis (Walker, 1856)
Synanthedon minplebia Wang & Yang, 2002
Synanthedon modesta (Butler, 1874)
Synanthedon moganensis Yang & Wang, 1992
Synanthedon monogama (Meyrick, 1932)
Synanthedon monozona (Hampson, 1910)
Synanthedon moupinicola Strand, 1925
Synanthedon multitarsus Špatenka & Arita, 1992
Synanthedon mushana (Matsumura, 1931)
Synanthedon myopaeformis (Borkhausen, 1789)
Synanthedon myopaeformis cruentata (Mann, 1859)
Synanthedon myopaeformis graeca (Staudinger, 1871)
Synanthedon myopaeformis luctuosa (Lederer, 1853)
Synanthedon myopaeformis myopaeformis (Borkhausen, 1789)
Synanthedon myopaeformis typhiaeformis (Borkhausen, 1789)
Synanthedon myrmosaepennis (Walker, 1856)
Synanthedon nannion Bryk, 1953
Synanthedon nautica (Meyrick, 1932)
Synanthedon neotropica Heppner & Duckworth, 1981
Synanthedon novaroensis (Edwards, 1881:199)
Synanthedon nuba (Beutenmüller, 1899)
Synanthedon nyanga (Beutenmüller, 1899)
Synanthedon olenda (Beutenmüller, 1899)
Synanthedon opiiformis (Walker, 1856)
Synanthedon orientalis Heppner & Duckworth, 1981
Synanthedon pamphyla Kallies, 2003
Synanthedon pauper (Le Cerf, 1916)
Synanthedon peltastiformis (Walker, 1856)
Synanthedon peltata (Meyrick, 1932)
Synanthedon pensilis (Swinhoe, 1892)
Synanthedon peruviana (Rothschild, 1911)
Synanthedon phaedrostoma (Meyrick, 1934)
Synanthedon phasiaeformis (Felder, 1861)
Synanthedon pictipes (Grote & Robinson, 1868)
Synanthedon pini (Kellicott, 1881)
Synanthedon pipiziformis (Lederer, 1855)
Synanthedon plagiophleps Zukowsky, 1936
Synanthedon platyuriformis (Walker, 1856)
Synanthedon polaris (Staudinger, 1877)
Synanthedon polygoni (Edwards, 1881)
Synanthedon producta (Matsumura, 1931)
Synanthedon proserpina (Druce, 1883)
Synanthedon proxima (Edwards, 1881)
Synanthedon pseudoscoliaeformis  Špatenka & Arita, 1992
Synanthedon pulchripennis (Walker, [1865])
Synanthedon pyrethra (Hampson, 1910)
Synanthedon pyri (Harris, 1830)
Synanthedon pyrodisca (Hampson, 1910)
Synanthedon nr pyrostoma (Unknown, Unknown)
Synanthedon quercus (Matsumura, 1911)
Synanthedon refulgens (Edwards, 1881)
Synanthedon resplendens (Edwards, 1881)
Synanthedon rhodia (Druce, 1899)
Synanthedon rhododendri (Beutenmüller, 1909)
Synanthedon rhodothictis (Meyrick, 1918)
Synanthedon rhyssaeformis (Walker, 1856)
Synanthedon richardsi (Engelhardt, 1946)
Synanthedon rileyana (Edwards, 1881)
Synanthedon romani Bryk, 1953
Synanthedon rubiana Kallies, Petersen & Riefenstahl, 1998
Synanthedon rubripalpis (Meyrick, 1932)
Synanthedon rubripicta Hampson, 1919
Synanthedon rubrofascia (Edwards, 1881)
Synanthedon santanna (Kaye, 1925)
Synanthedon sapygaeformis (Walker, 1856)
Synanthedon sassafras Xu, 1997
Synanthedon saxifragae (Edwards, 1881)
Synanthedon scarabitis (Meyrick, 1921)
Synanthedon sciophilaeformis (Walker, 1856)
Synanthedon scitula (Harris, 1839)
Synanthedon scoliaeformis (Borkhausen, 1789)
Synanthedon scoliaeformis japonica Špatenka & Arita, 1992
Synanthedon scoliaeformis scoliaeformis (Borkhausen, 1789)
Synanthedon scythropa Zukowsky, 1936
Synanthedon sellustiformis (Druce, 1883)
Synanthedon sequoiae (Edwards, 1881)
Synanthedon serica (Alpheraky, 1882)
Synanthedon sigmoidea (Beutenmüller, 1897)
Synanthedon simois (Druce, 1899)
Synanthedon sodalis Püngeler, 1912
Synanthedon soffneri Špatenka, 1983
Synanthedon spatenkai Gorbunov, 1991
Synanthedon spheciformis ([Denis & Schiffermüller], 1775)
Synanthedon sphenodes Diakonoff, [1968]
Synanthedon spuleri (Fuchs, 1908)
Synanthedon squamata (Gaede, 1929)
Synanthedon stenothyris (Meyrick, 1933)
Synanthedon stomoxiformis (Hübner, 1790)
Synanthedon stomoxiformis amasina (Staudinger, 1856)
Synanthedon stomoxiformis levantina de Freina & Lingenhöle, 2000
Synanthedon stomoxiformis riefenstahli Špatenka, 1997
Synanthedon stomoxiformis stomoxiformis (Hübner, 1790)
Synanthedon subaurata Le Cerf, 1916b
Synanthedon syriaca Špatenka, 2001
Synanthedon talischensis (Bartel, 1906)
Synanthedon tenuis (Butler, 1878)
Synanthedon tenuiventris Le Cerf, 1916
Synanthedon tetranoma (Meyrick, 1932)
Synanthedon theryi Le Cerf, 1916
Synanthedon tipuliformis (Clerck, 1759)
Synanthedon tosevskii Špatenka, 1987
Synanthedon trithyris (Meyrick, 1926)
Synanthedon tryphoniformis (Walker, 1856)
Synanthedon ulmicola Yang & Wang, 1989
Synanthedon unocingulata Bartel, 1912
Synanthedon uralensis (Bartel, 1906)
Synanthedon uranauges (Meyrick, 1926)
Synanthedon velox (Fixsen, 1887)
Synanthedon ventralis (Druce, 1911)
Synanthedon versicolor Le Cerf, 1916
Synanthedon vespiformis (Linnaeus, 1761)
Synanthedon viburni Engelhardt, 1925
Synanthedon xanthonympha (Meyrick, 1921)
Synanthedon xanthopyga (Aurivillius, 1905)
Synanthedon xanthosoma (Hampson, [1893])
Synanthedon xanthozonata (Hampson, 1895)
Synanthedon yanoi Špatenka & Arita, 1992

References

External links

Sesiidae
Moth genera
Taxa named by Jacob Hübner